Majetín is a municipality and village in Olomouc District in the Olomouc Region of the Czech Republic. It has about 1,200 inhabitants.

Geography

Majetín is located in the ethnographic region of Haná. The river Olešnice, a tributary of the Morávka, flows south of the village and forms the border of the municipality. In the centre of Majetín is located  Hliník fish pond.

History
In the 13th century, a water castle existed at the site. Majetín was first mentioned in a 1277 deed, when one Heřman of Moiethin acted as mediator in a border dispute between the monasteries of Hradisko and Velehrad. Majetín was made up of a water castle and hamlet of Starý Majetín.

In 1306, King Wenceslaus III of Bohemia vested Lord Unka of Majetín with extended woodland estates which also were claimed by the Olomouc citizens who founded the village of Grygov. A lengthy conflict arose which was finally decided in 1352 by John Henry, Margrave of Moravia in favour of Olomouc. The Lords of Majetín remained in dispute with their neighbours; during the Hussite Wars they supported the insurgents, whereafter Emperor Sigismund had their castle demolished.

When the line became extinct in 1440, the estates changed hands several times. In 1521 Majetín was purchased by the Moravian governor John III of Pernstein and incorporated into the lordship of Tovačov.

Transport
The railway line from Olomouc to Přerov runs through the municipality. The nearest train station is at neighbouring Brodek u Přerova.

Sights
The most notable building is the Church of Saints Cyril and Methodius from 1863. The rectory was built in 1872. The Chapel of Our Lady of Lourdes was established in 1885 above a spring of water which is considered curative.

References

External links

Villages in Olomouc District